Eleison is Greek for  have mercy and may refer to:
 Kyrie Eleison or Christe Eleison, common name of an important prayer of Christian liturgy

See also
 Kyrie (disambiguation)